Zeng Junchen (6 September 1888 – 6 July 1964), courtesy name Yun'an, art name Zhengran, was a Chinese businessman and opium kingpin from Sichuan. Starting off as a restaurateur and salt merchant, he then became a kingpin and amassed a fortune in some four years of dealing with opium. He was often referred to as China's "King of Opium". Zeng was also a philanthropist and donated large sums to charities and schools. He died in July 1964, aged 76, in Chongqing. Zeng's former residence in Shapingba District is now listed as a local monument.

Early life and career
Zeng was born on 6 September 1888 in Weiyuan County, Sichuan, China; his birth name was Chenxun. He also had an art name, Zhengran. His grandfather was Zeng Huailun (曾怀伦), a coal factory and dye-house owner. Chenxun's father Zeng Bencan (曾本灿) took over the business from the eldest Zeng. He began working in salt harvesting at the age of 9, and became a salt merchant around 1905, forging connections with other traders and local authorities. Concurrently, he worked at the Luzhou-based Rong Ji Provisions Store (荣记粮店) with his wife and uncle. Owing to local unrest, food prices were high and Zeng profited from the situation. He used these earnings to open a tavern named "Big Diner" (大餐楼) in 1914; it was, at that time, the biggest food establishment in Luzhou. In 1928, Zeng partnered with a fellow salt merchant to establish a Hubei-based trading firm named Yu Marketing (渝运销湖北). At the peak of its operations, their business handled three hundred-odd "loads" (载) of salt daily, with one load weighing around 93600 catties (approximately 46,000 kilograms); this made them one of the largest salt carriers in the country. For ten years, Zeng served as president of the Chongqing Salt Merchants' Association.

His stint in the salt industry ended after three decades. Salt taxes hit a new high and substantially affected earnings. In 1935, during the boom of the opium trade, Zeng decided to pursue the riches involved in drug-dealing. Nonetheless, he was initially apprehensive of the risk involved. He approached a handful of banks for loans, and signed a pact with friends Li Chongjiang (李舂江) and Shi Zhuxuan (石竹轩), Zeng was able to pool together 300,000 yuan to start his new business, and then reportedly earned nine times that amount.

Fortunately for Zeng, his established dealings with high-ranking officials, including He Guoguang (賀國光), Xia Douyin, Xu Yuanquan, and He Chenrui (何成睿) gave him leeway in operating his opium empire. In fact, the authorities unofficially allied with opium dealers as a means of netting extra revenue and the drug trade was difficult to clamp down on. By-and-by the opium-dealing circle grew in size, largely due to an influx of salt merchants, and Zeng was granted the right to legally ship opium by his friends in the government who also invested in his firms. He was appointed chairman of the "Special Business Association" whose members included drug dealers and smugglers from all parts of the world.

At the height, Zeng was taking in more than a hundred thousand yuan from drugs daily. Zeng would be informed of a tax increase coming his way, and he would then promptly arrange for a meetup with members of the Sichuan treasury, to present them with gifts and a promissory note. His wealth enabled him to purchase various plots of farmland in China. In addition to owning a mega tobacco company, Shu Yi (蜀益烟草公司), he was sole proprietor of Victory Bank (胜利银行) and had shares in Sichuan Meifeng Chemical, Sichuan Salt, and "eleven other banks". Zeng's disciple was Jiangjin-raised Wang Zhengping (王政平), who went on to found his own cartel.

Retirement and death
Following a nationwide crackdown on drugs and growing competition, Zeng retired from the trade in 1939 with substantial savings. He published an account of his time in the realm of opium, titled Five Years In The "Special Business" (经营特业五年纪略). In the later half of his life, he donated to a range of organisations, including a primary school in Sichuan. During a famine in Sichuan in 1943, Zeng personally fed victims whom he observed looting a grocery store at the Shangqishi Market. Zeng was a supporter of the Chiang Kai-shek-led Kuomintang and expressed dismay at its defeat in the civil war against Mao Zedong in 1949. He reportedly said, "All the success I have attained in my life has been a façade; alas, I fall together with the Kuomintang government. I have overcome all challenges, bar this." Zeng Junchen died on 6 July 1964 in Chongqing, China, at age 76. His former residence in Shapingba, Chongqing, a two-story building with a garden, was gazetted as a monument by the local government in May 2006.

Zeng's estimated earnings of five to six million yuan trading opium made him one of, if not the, most successful drug barons of China during his period. Li Xiaoxiong writes in Poppies and Politics in China that Zeng was the "most famous opium merchant (who) made a huge amount of money at the peak of the opium mania." Zeng is frequently referred to as the "King of Opium."  His contemporaries regarded him as the "opium king of East Sichuan"; an Italian drug dealer, a Jenkins, lauded Zeng for transforming Sichuan into the "drug capital of the world", whereas an unnamed Chongqing official remarked that Zeng was responsible for the livelihoods of "so many".

Citations

Notes

References

Bibliography
 
 
 
 
 
 
 
 
 
 
 
 
 

1888 births
1964 deaths
People from Neijiang
Chinese drug traffickers
Chinese merchants
Businesspeople from Sichuan